The 1994 Skate America was held at the Civic Arena in Pittsburgh, Pennsylvania on October 26–31. Medals were awarded in the disciplines of men's singles, ladies' singles, pair skating, and ice dancing.

Results

Men

Ladies

Pairs

Ice dancing

External links
 Results

Skate America, 1994
Skate America